A conflict is a struggle and a clash of interest, opinion, or even principles. Conflict will always be found in society; as the basis of conflict may vary to be personal, racial, class, caste, political and international. Conflict may also be emotional, intellectual, and theoretical, in which case academic recognition may, or may not be, a significant motive. Intellectual conflict is a subclass of cultural conflict, a conflict that tends to grow over time due to different cultural values and beliefs.

Conflict in a group often follows a specific course. Routine group interaction is first disrupted by an initial conflict within the group, often caused by internal differences of opinion, disagreements between its members, or scarcity of resources available to the group. At this point, the group is no longer united, and may split into coalitions. This period of conflict escalation in some cases gives way to a conflict resolution stage, after which the group can eventually return to routine group interaction or split.

Definitions
M. Afzalur, a professor at Western Kentucky University,  notes there is no single universally accepted definition of conflict. He notes that one issue of contention is whether the conflict is a situation or a type of behaviour.

Citing a review of definitions of organizational conflicts in 1990 by Robert A. Baron,  Afzalur notes that all definitions of conflict include known opposing interests and the process of trying to stop the opposing view or views. Building on that, the proposed definition of conflict by Afzalur is "an interactive process manifested in incompatibility, disagreement or dissonance within or between social entities." Afzalur also notes that a conflict may be limited to one individual, who is conflicted within himself (the intrapersonal conflict). Afzalur lists some manifestations of conflict behavior, starting with disagreement followed by verbal abuse and interference.

Another definition of conflict is proposed by Michael Nicholson, professor of Internal Relation at the University of Sussex, who defines it as an activity which takes place when conscious beings (individuals or groups) wish to carry out mutually inconsistent acts concerning their wants, needs or obligations. Conflict is an escalation of a disagreement, which is its common prerequisite, and is characterized by the existence of conflict behavior, in which the beings are actively trying to damage one another.

Role of emotion in inter-group relations

A key player in inter-group relations and conflict is the collective sentiment a person's own group (in-group) feels toward another group (out-group). These inter-group emotions are usually negative, and range in intensity from feelings of discomfort when interacting with a member of a certain other group to full on hatred for another group and its members. For example, in Fischer's organizational research at the University of Oxford, inter-group conflict was so 'heated' that it became mutually destructive and intractable, resulting in organizational collapse.

Out-group-directed emotions can be expressed both verbally and non-verbally, and according to the stereotype content model, are dictated by two dimensions: the perceived warmth (friendliness) and competence of the other group (skillfulness). Depending on the perceived degree of warmth and competence, the stereotype content model predicts four basic emotions that could be directed toward the out-group (Forsyth, 2010).

Envy
Envy results when the out-group is perceived to have high competence, but low warmth (Cuddy, Fiske & Glick, 2007). Envious groups are usually jealous of another group's symbolic and tangible achievements and view that group as competition (Forsyth,  2010).

Contempt
Contempt results when the out-group is taken to be low in both competence and warmth (Cuddy, Fiske & Glick, 2007). According to Forsyth, contempt is one of the most frequent intergroup emotions. In this situation, the out-group is held responsible for its own failures. In-group members also believe that their conflict with the out-group can never be resolved (Forsyth, 2010).

Pity
Out-groups that are believed by the in-group to be high in warmth but low in competence are pitied (Cuddy, Fiske & Glick, 2007). Usually pitied groups are lower in status than the in-group and are not believed to be responsible for their failures (Forsyth, 2010).

Admiration
Admiration occurs when an out-group is taken to be high in both warmth and competence, however, admiration is very rare because these two conditions are seldom met (Cuddy, Fiske & Glick, 2007). An admired out-group is thought to be completely deserving of its accomplishments. Admiration is thought to be most likely to arise when a member of the in-group can take pride in the accomplishments of the out-group, and when the out-group achieving does not interfere with the in-group (Forsyth, 2010).

Types of conflict

In cases of intragroup conflict, there is a conflict between the overall goals of the general group, and the goals of at least one person in that group.  The disagreements may also be examples of interpersonal conflict, a conflict between two or more people. More specific types of conflict include the following.

 Content conflict occurs when individuals disagree about how to deal with a certain issue. This can be a good thing as it has the potential to stimulate discussion and increase motivation.
 Relationship conflict occurs when individuals disagree about one another. This relational conflicts decreases performance, loyalty, satisfaction and commitment, and causes individuals to be irritable, negative and suspicious. This stems from interpersonal incompatibilities. It is an awareness of frictions caused by frustrations, annoyance, and irritations. Relationship conflict is comparable to affective and cognitive conflict as defined by Amason and Pinkley, respectively.
 Process conflict refers to disagreement over the group's approach to the task, its methods, and its group process. They note that although relationship conflict and process conflict are harmful, task conflict is found to be beneficial since it encourages diversity of opinions, although care should be taken so it does not develop into a process or relationship conflict.
 Task conflict is related to disagreements in viewpoints and opinion about a particular task in group settings. It is associated with two interrelated and beneficial effects. The first is group decision quality. Task conflict encourages greater cognitive understanding of the issue being discussed. This leads to better decision making for the groups that use task conflict. The second is affective acceptance of group decisions. Task conflict can lead to increased satisfaction with the group decision and a desire to stay in the group.
 Affective conflict is an emotional conflict developed from interpersonal incompatibilities and disputes. It often produces suspicion, distrust, and hostility. Therefore, it is seen as a negative kind of conflict and an obstacle to those who experience it and is described as "dysfunctional."
 Cognitive conflict occurs during tasks and comes from a difference in perspective and judgement. It improves decision making and allows for the freer exchange of information between group members. Cognitive conflict is seen as a positive tension that promotes good group work.

The following are examples of conflict that could be either intragroup or intergroup conflict.

 Conflict of interest is involvement in multiple interests which could possibly corrupt the motivation or decision-making.
 Cultural conflict is a type of conflict that occurs when different cultural values and beliefs clash.
 Ethnic conflict is conflict between two or more contending ethnic groups.
 Intergroup conflict is conflict between two or more groups.
 Organizational conflict is discord caused by opposition of needs, values, and interests between people working together.
 Role conflict involves incompatible demands placed upon a person in a manner that makes accomplishing both troublesome.
 Social conflict is the struggle for supremacy or autonomy between social classes.
 Work–family conflict involves incompatible demands between the work and family roles of an individual.
Conflict is rarely seen as constructive; however, in certain contexts (such as competition in sports), moderate levels of conflict can be seen as being mutually beneficial, facilitating understanding, tolerance, learning, and effectiveness. In a team setting, the group can learn to overcome intragroup conflict which would conclude to minimizing negative outcomes. With minimizing negative outcomes, positive outcomes will grow with increase of teamwork, working as a group, and increase of understanding and cooperation with teammates which eventually leads to the control on intragroup conflict.

Five beliefs that propel groups toward conflict

Roy and Judy Eidelson (2003) investigated some of the important roles that beliefs may play in triggering or constraining conflict between groups. On the basis of a review of relevant literature, five belief domains stand out as especially noteworthy: Superiority, injustice, vulnerability, distrust and helplessness.

Superiority
Individual-level core belief: This is a belief that an individual is better than anyone else and therefore many of the social constructs because the individual sees their own thoughts as "privileged" and therefore do not get along well with others. People with this belief often have attitudes of "specialness, deservingness, and entitlement."

Group-level worldview: When moving from the individual-level core belief to the Group-level worldview most of the concepts stay the same. The major difference is that these attitudes apply to large groups instead of individuals. One example of this is "ethnocentric monoculturalism,"  a term meaning that one sees their own cultural heritage as better than another's.

Injustice
Individual-level core belief: This belief is that an individual has been mistreated in a way that affects them in a major way. This mistreatment is most often an interpretation of "disappointment and betrayal".

Group-level worldview: This is the receiving end of the superiority group-level. This group takes grievance at another group for the same reasons an individual takes grievance at another. For perceived injustices from disappointment, betrayal, and mistreatment.

Vulnerability
Individual-level core belief: This is a constant anxiety. It is when a person feels that he/she is not in control and feel as though they are living "perpetually in harm's way".

Group-level worldview: A group that feels vulnerability due to an imagined threat in the future. This strengthens the group's ties and allows them to "focus group behavior in specific directions that include hostility."

Distrust
Individual-level core belief: This is based on a "presumed hostility and malignant intent seen in others". It drives one to act in hostile ways and prevents the creation of healthy relationships.

Group-level worldview: This separates the in-group from the out-group in a way that is not easily rectified, as the in-group forms a lasting stereotype that is applied to the out-group and must be disproven by the out-group.

Helplessness
Individual-level core belief: A deep set belief that no matter what an individual does the outcome will be unfavorable. As though the individual is "lacking the necessary ability" or a belief the individual did not have sufficient help or the environment is against them.

Group-level worldview: When a group has those same beliefs of dependency and powerlessness. This also reflects how much growth the environment has to offer.

Conflict escalation 
Although the involved parties may hope to reach a solution to their dispute quickly, psychological and interpersonal factors can frustrate their attempts to control the conflict, and in this case, conflict escalation occurs. Conflict escalation "can be understood as an intensification of a conflict with regard to the observed extent and the means used". A number of factors including increased commitment to one's position, use of harder influence tactics, and formation of coalitions propel the escalation of the conflict.

Uncertainty and commitment 
As conflicts escalate, group members' doubts and uncertainties are replaced with a firm commitment to their position. People rationalize their choices once they have made them: they seek out information that supports their views, reject information that disconfirms their views, and become more entrenched in their original position (also see confirmatory bias). Additionally, people believe that once they commit to a position publicly, they should stick with it. Sometimes, they may realize the shortcomings of their views, but they continue defending those views and arguing against their opponents just to save face. Finally, if the opponents argue too strongly, reactance may set in and group members become even more committed to the position.

Perception and misperception 
Individuals' reactions to the conflict are shaped by their perception of the situation and people in the situation. During the conflict, opponents' inferences about each other's strengths, attitudes, values, and personal qualities tend to be largely distorted.

Misattribution 
During the conflict, people explain their opponents' actions in ways that make the problem worse. Fundamental attribution error occurs when one assumes that opponents' behavior was caused by personal (dispositional) rather than situational (environmental) factors. When conflict continues for a while, opponents might decide that this conflict is intractable. People usually expect intractable conflicts to be prolonged, intense, and very hard to resolve.

Misperceiving motivations 
During the conflict, opponents often become mistrustful of one another wondering if their cooperative motivations were replaced by competitive ones. This loss of trust makes it difficult to return to the cooperative relationship. People with competitive social value orientations (SVOs) are the most inaccurate in their perception of opponents' motivation. They often think that others compete with them when in fact, there is no competition going on. Competitors are also more biased in their search for information that confirms their suspicions that others compete with them. They also tend to deliberately misrepresent their intentions, sometimes claiming to be more cooperatively oriented than they actually are.

Soft tactics and hard tactics 
People use soft tactics at the outset of the conflict, but as it escalates, tactics become stronger and harder. To demonstrate this phenomenon, Mikolic, Parker, and Pruitt (1997) simulated a conflict situation by creating a "birthday card factory" with study participants who were paid a small amount for each card they manufactured using paper, colored markers, and ribbons. The work went well until researchers' confederate who posed as another participant started hoarding production materials. Initially, group members tried to solve the problem with statements and requests. When these methods failed they shifted to demands and complaints, and then to threats, abuse, and anger.

Although hard tactics can overwhelm the opponent, they often intensify conflicts. Morton Deutsch and Robert Krauss (1960) used trucking game experiment to demonstrate that capacity to threaten others intensifies conflict. They also showed that establishing a communication link does not always help to solve the dispute. If one party threatens the other, the threatened party will fare best if it cannot respond with a counterthreat. Equally powerful opponents, however, learn to avoid the use of power if the fear of retaliation is high.

Reciprocity and upward conflict spiral 
In many cases, upward conflict spirals are sustained by the norms of reciprocity: if one group or person criticizes the other, the criticized person or group feels justified in doing the same. In conflict situations, opponents often follow the norm of rough reciprocity, i.e. they give too much (overmatching) or too little (undermatching) in return. At low levels of conflict, opponents overmatch their threats, while at high levels of conflict they undermatch their threats. Overmatching may serve as a strong warning, while undermatching may be used to send conciliatory messages.

Few and many 
When conflicts erupt, group members use coalitions to shift the balance of power in their favor, and it is typical for multiparty conflicts to reduce to two-party blocks over time. Coalitions contribute to the conflict because they draw more members of the group into the affray.  Individuals in coalitions work not only to ensure their own outcomes but also to worsen outcomes of non-coalition members. Those who are excluded from the coalition react with hostility and try to regain power by forming their own coalition. Thus, coalitions need to be constantly maintained through strategic bargaining and negotiation.

Irritation and anger 
It is generally difficult for most people to remain calm and collected in a conflict situation. However, an increase in negative emotions (i.e. anger) only exacerbates the initial conflict. Even when group members want to discuss their positions calmly and dispassionately, once they become committed to their positions, an emotional expression often replaces logical discussion. Anger is also contagious: when group member negotiates with someone who is angry, they become angry themselves.

Conflict resolution

Nicholson notes that a conflict is resolved when the inconsistency between wishes and actions of parties is resolved. Negotiation is an important part of conflict resolution, and any design of a process which tries to incorporate positive conflict from the start needs to be cautious not to let it degenerate into the negative types of conflict.

Conflict mediation

Conflict is a social process that is exacerbated when individual members of a group take sides in the debate. Among the methods to resolve conflict is mediation of the dispute by a group member not currently involved in the dispute. More specifically, a mediator is defined as a person who attempts to resolve a conflict between two group members by intervening in this conflict. Put simply, the mediator can be thought of as a disinterested guide directs the disputants through the process of developing a solution to a disagreement (Forsyth, 2010).

Although the tendency will be for group members who are uninvolved in the dispute to remain uninvolved,  in some cases, the sheer intensity of the conflict may escalate to the point where mediation is unavoidable. Third party mediation of the conflict opens avenues for communication between group members in conflict. It allows members to express their opinions and request clarification of other member's standpoints while the mediator acts as a form of protection against any shame or "loss of face" that either disputant may experience. This can be done by shedding a positive light on the reconciliation that was made during the mediation process. For instance, if it was negotiated that two cashiers will rotate the weekends they work, the mediator might point out that now each worker gets a weekend off every two weeks (Forsyth, 2010).

The mediator can also offer assistance in refining solutions and making counter-offers between members, adjusting the time and location of meetings so that they are mutually satisfying for both parties (Forsyth, 2010).

According to Forsyth (2010), there are three major mediation approaches:

 Inquisitorial procedure: Using this procedure, the mediator asks each of the disputants a series of questions, considers the two sets of responses, and then selects and imposes a mandatory solution on the members. The inquisitorial procedure is the least popular approach to mediation.
 Arbitration: Here, mediation involves the two disputants explaining their arguments to the mediator, who creates a solution based on the arguments presented. Arbitration is best for low intensity conflict, but is the most favored mediation style overall.
 Moot: The moot approach involves an open discussion  between disputants and the mediator about the problems and potential solutions. In the moot approach, the mediator cannot impose a mandatory solution. After arbitration, a moot is the most preferred mediation style.

In practice, conflict resolution is often interwoven with daily activities, as in organizations, workplaces and institutions. Staff and residents in a youth care setting, for instance, interweave everyday concerns (meals, lessons, breaks, meetings, or other mundane but concerted projects) with interpersonal disputes.

See also
 Dassler brothers feud
 Feud
 Conflict theories
 Consensus decision-making
 Peace and conflict studies
 Social conflict
 Sociology of peace, war, and social conflict
 War

References

 
Organizational theory